Stephanos Christopoulos (1876 – after 1906) was a Greek wrestler. He was a member of Gymnastiki Etaireia Patron, that merged in 1923 with Panachaikos Gymnastikos syllogos to become Panachaiki Gymnastiki Enosi.

Christopoulos competed at the 1896 Summer Olympics in Athens. He defeated Momcsilló Tapavicza of Hungary in the first bout of the wrestling competition, matching the Hungarian in skill and wearing the other wrestler down until he conceded the match.  In the semifinal, Christopoulos faced fellow Greek Georgios Tsitas. The result of that match was an injured shoulder and a loss for Christopoulos when Tsitas threw him. He finished third behind Tsitas and the German Carl Schuhmann, winning the bronze medal.

Christopoulos returned to the competitive stage in Athens ten years later to compete in the 1906 Intercalated Games, he entered three events, his first event was in the weightlifting the two handed lift, he managed to lift 108.5 kilogrammes and finished in tied for seventh place, he also competed in the one handed lift but only lifted 40 kilogrammes and finished eleventh out of the 12 starters. He also entered the Wrestling in the heavyweight division, he won his first round against Austrian, Rudolf Arnold, in the next round he lost to Marcel Dubois from Belgium.

References

External links
 
  (Digitally available at )

1876 births
Year of death missing
Wrestlers at the 1896 Summer Olympics
19th-century sportsmen
Greek male sport wrestlers
Olympic bronze medalists for Greece
Olympic wrestlers of Greece
Sportspeople from Patras
Olympic medalists in wrestling
Medalists at the 1896 Summer Olympics
Weightlifters at the 1906 Intercalated Games
Place of death missing